Defending champion Casper Ruud defeated João Sousa in the final, 7–6(7–3), 4–6, 7–6(7–1) to win the singles tennis title at the 2022 Geneva Open.

Seeds
The top four seeds receive a bye into the second round.

Draw

Finals

Top half

Bottom half

Qualifying

Seeds

Qualifiers

Qualifying draw

First qualifier

Second qualifier

Third qualifier

Fourth qualifier

References

External links
 Main draw
 Qualifying draw

Geneva Open - Singles
Singles
2022 in Swiss sport